A frontbend is a contortion position where the body is curved forward at the hips and spine. In an extreme frontbend, some contortionists can place the backs of their knees behind their shoulders.

See also
Paschimottanasana (seated forward bend with legs straight)
Uttanasana (standing forward bend with legs straight)
Kurmasana "Tortoise pose" (seated forward bend with arms under straight legs) 
Bowing

External links
Carol Liabos, an exponent of the frontbend

Contortion
Human positions